La Poma is a department located in Salta Province, Argentina. It is the least populated department of the province and its capital is the town of La Poma.

Geography

Overview
The department is located in the north-western area of the province, near the Andes, and includes the Puna de Atacama. It consists of 2 areas united by a territorial strip passing through the settlement of Muñano: in north the area of Cobres and in south the one of La Poma. It borders with Jujuy Province and the departments of Los Andes, Cachi and  Rosario de Lerma.

Places
Towns and municipalities:
 La Poma (615 inh.)
 Cobres (112 inh.)

Other localities and places:
 Cerro Negro
 El Rodeo
 El Saladillo
 El Trigal
 El Volcán
 Muñano
 Potrerillos
 Tipán

See also 
Tren a las Nubes
Los Cardones National Park
Salta–Antofagasta railway

References

External links 
 La Poma Department on Salta Province website

Departments of Salta Province